Konstantinos Konstantinidis (1856–1930) was a Greek merchant and one of the first to advocate for an Independent Republic of Pontus.
He was born in Trapezunt, Pontus.

References

External links
 Pandektis.ekt.gr (Institute for Neohellenic Research): Κωνσταντίνος Κωνσταντινίδης
 Pontos News: Κωνσταντινίδης Κωνσταντίνος

1856 births
1930 deaths
Greek activists
People associated with identity politics
Greek businesspeople
People from Trabzon
Pontic Greeks